¡Vuelven los García! ("The Return of the García!") is a 1947 Mexican comedy drama film starring Carlos Orellana.

Luis Antonio, Jose Luis and Luis Manuel are back and seemingly at ease with each other. However, destiny still has something in store for them: the spawn of one of the evil Lopez, siblings Leon and Juan Simon, are looking for vengeance.

External links
 

1947 films
1940s Spanish-language films
Mexican black-and-white films
Mexican comedy-drama films
1947 comedy-drama films
1940s Mexican films